The Apostolic Nunciature to Gabon is an ecclesiastical office of the Catholic Church in Gabon. It is a diplomatic post of the Holy See, whose representative is called the Apostolic Nuncio with the rank of an ambassador.

List of papal representatives
Apostolic Pro-Nuncios
Luigi Poggi (31 October 1967 – 21 May 1969)
Ernesto Gallina (16 July 1969 - 13 March 1971)
Jean Jadot (15 May 1971 - 23 May 1973)
Luciano Storero (30 June 1973 - 14 July 1976)
Giuseppe Uhac (15 January 1977 - 3 June 1981)
Donato Squicciarini (16 September 1981 - 1 July 1989)
Santos Abril y Castelló (2 October 1989 - 24 February 1996)
Apostolic Nuncios 
Luigi Pezzuto (7 December 1996 - 22 May 1999)
Mario Roberto Cassari (3 August 1999 - 31 July 2004)
Andrés Carrascosa Coso (26 August 2004  - 12 January 2009)
Jan Romeo Pawłowski (18 March 2009 - 7 December 2015)
Francisco Escalante Molina (21 May 2016 – 4 June 2021)
Javier Herrera Corona (2 May 2022 – present)

References

 
Gabon